Here is a partial list of preschools, primary schools, secondary schools, vocational education and university bodies both public and private in Papua New Guinea.

Schools

A–J

Agenahambo Primary School, Popondetta, Or Provinc
Aiyura National High School, Kainantu, EHP
Alkena Primary School, Tambul, WHP
Amba Demonstration Primary School, Lae, Morobe Province
Anditale High School, Enga Province
Asaroka Lutheran Secondary School, Asaro, EHP
Australian International School Papua New Guinea (Kindergarten, Foundation, Year 1 - Year 9), Goroka, EHP
Ayamointinu Primary School, Kainantu, EHP
Baluan Primary School, Balopa LLG, Manus
Bambusi International Primary School, Popondetta, Oro Province
Bariji High School, Popondetta, Oro Province
Bena Bena Secondary High School
Birdwing Independent School, Boroko, NCD
Bishop Leo Secondary School, Wewak, East Sepik 
Bishop Wade Secondary High School, Tarlena, ARoB
Blessed Peter Torot Primary School, Kreer Heights, Wewak, East Sepik 
Brandi Secondary School, Wewak, East Sepik
Bugandi Secondary School, Lae
Bumayong Lutheran Secondary School, Lae, MP
Calvary Christian School ACE School of Tomorrow, Lae, Morobe Province
Cameron High School, Alotau
Coronation College, Lae
Carr Memorial Adventist School, Ensisi, Port Moresby, NCD
Dregerhafen Secondary School, Finschhafen 
East Goroka High School, Eastern Highlands Province 
East Goroka Primary School, Eastern Highlands Province 
ECOM Secondary School, Lugos Mission Station, Lorengau, Manus Province
The Ela/Murray International School
Embogo High School, Ijivitari Northern (Oro) Province
Fatima Secondary School, Banz, WHP
Fayantina High School, Henganofi, Eastern Highlands Province 
Fayantina Primary School, Henganofi, Eastern Highlands Province 
Foru Community School, Safia, Northern (Oro) Province
Gantom Primary School, Lae, MP
Gapogunagavo Primary School, Eastern Highlands Province 
George Brown High School, Kerevat, East New Britain Province
Garaina Primary School, Bulolo District, MP
Gerehu Secondary School, Port Moresby, NCD
Gordons Secondary School, Port Moresby, NCD
Goroka Christian Academy, Goroka, EHP
Goroka International School, IEA
Goroka Secondary High School, EHP
Grace Memorial Secondary SChool, Wau, Lae, Morobe Province
Gurguru Community School, Tufi Northern (Oro) Province
Gumine primary school, Gumine, Simbu province
Habanofi Primary School,Henganofi, Eastern Highlands Province 
Haikoast Community School, Lae 
Henganofi Secondary School, Henganofi, EHP
Henganofi Primary School, Henganofi, Eastern Highlands Province 
Highland Lutheran International School, Wabag
Highlands Christian Grammar, Mt Hagen, WHP
Holy Name Secondary School, Milne Bay Province 
Hutjena Secondary High School, Buka, ARoB 
Igam Barracks Primary School, Lae, Morobe Province 
Imaka Primary School, Henganofi, Eastern Highlands Province 
Immanuel Lutheran School, Lae 
The International School of Lae, Lae
Ivingoi High School, Okapa, EHP
Iyalibu Secondary School, SHP
Jimi River Primary School, WHP
Jimi Valley High School, Western Highlands Province
Jomba Demonstration School, Madang 
Jubilee Catholic Secondary School, Boroko 
Kero high school, southern Highlands

K–M

Kabiufa Adventist Secondary School, Goroka, EHP
Kafetina High School, Henganofi, Eastern Highlands Province 
Kafetina Primary School, Henganofi, Eastern Highlands Province 
Kainantu High School, Kainantu, EHP
The Kalibobo School, Kalibobo, MADANG
Kalamanagunan Primary School, Kokopo, East New Britain Province
Kambubu Adventist Secondary School, via Kokopo, ENB
Kanampa FODE Center, Kainantu, EHP
Kandep High School
Kapakamarigi Primary School, Unggai Bena, Eastern Highlands Province 
Karap Primary School, Jimi District, WHP
Karkar High School, Kinim, Karkar Island
Kauil Community School, Jimi District, WHP
Kaupena Community School, Mt Hagen 
Kerebabe Primary School,Henganofi, Eastern Highlands Province 
Kerevat National High School, East New Britain Province
Kerowaghi Secondary School, Kerowaghi, Chimbu Province
Kintinu Primary School,Unggai Bena, Eastern Highlands Province 
Kiorota (Isivita) Primary School, Popondetta, Oro Province
Kiripia, St. Peter & Paul's Primary School, SPX 104-Joe Pissmaan, Mt Hagen, WHP
Kitip Lutheran Secondary School, Mt Hagen, WHP
Kiunga International School
Kokopo Primary School, Kokopo, East New Britain Province
Kokopo Secondary School, East New Britain Province
Kompiam High School, Enga Province
Kondiu Secondary School, Kundiawa, Chimbu Province
Kopafo-Kioso Primary School, Unggai Bena, Eastern Highlands Province 
Kopen Secondary School, Enga Province
Korefeigu Primary School,Unggai Bena, Eastern Highlands Province 
Kreer Primary School, Wewak, East Sepik
Kuga Primary School, Nebilyer, WHP
Kumbu Pui Elementary School, Kumbu Pui, Nebilyer, WHP
Kumdi Primary School, WHP
Kundis Primary School, Enga Province
Kusambuk Primary School, ESP
Lae Christian Academy, Lae, MP
Lae Secondary School
Lakui Primary School, Enga Province
Landor Primary School, Enga Province
Liak Primary School, Misima Island, Milne Bay Province
Lihir International Primary School, Londolovit, Lihir Island, NIP
Lihir Secondary School, Lihir Island, NIP
Lufa High School, Lufa, EHP
Mainohana Catholic Secondary School, Kairuku, Central Province
Malabunga Secondary School, Rabaul, ENBP
Malaguna Technical Secondary School, Rabaul, ENBP
Malala Secondary School
Magamaga Primary School, Central Province
Mangai Secondary School, New Ireland Province
Manus Secondary School, Lorengau, Manus Province
Martyrs Memorial Secondary School, Popondetta, Oro Province
 Melton Grammar Montessori School, Alotau, Kokopo ENB
Mendi High School, SHP
Menyamya High School, Menyamya, EHP
Mercy Secondary School (Yarapos), Wewak, East Sepik
Mesauka Secondary School, Goroka, EHP
Mile Elementary School, ENBP
Mile Primary School, East New Britain Province
Minj High School, Minj, WHP
Misima High School, Milne Bay Province
Moikepa Primary School,Henganofi, Eastern Highlands Province 
Mongiol Primary School, Wewak, East Sepik
Mogol Secondary School, SHP
Mongol Secondary School, Mendi, SHP
Monokam Primary School, Enga Province
Mt. Diamond Adventist Secondary School, Central Province
Mt. Hagen Park Day Secondary School, WHP
Mt. Hagen Secondary School, Mt. Hagen, WHP
Mukulu Elementary School, East New Britain province
Mukulu Elementary S
Muro Elementary School, East New Britain Province
Muaina High School, Kundiawa 
Munji Primary School, ESP

N–Z

Gogo-Teine Agyonga Memorial Primary School, Chuave, Simbu Province
Giriyu-Teine Agyonga Memorial Primary School, Chuave, Simbu Province
Norome-Teine Agyonga Memorial Primary School, Chuave, Simbu Province
Yorori-Teine Agyonga Memorial Primary School, Chuave, Simbu Province
Eigun-Teine Agyonga Memorial Primary School, Chuave, Simbu Province
Beroma-Komane Memorial Primary School, Chuave, Simbu Province
Naiepelam Primary School, Enga Province
Nebilyer High School, Pabrabuk, WHP
New Erima Primary School, Wild Life NCD
Nonu Primary School, Nonu Ave Boroko
Notre Dame Girls Secondary School, WHP
Numonohi Christian Academy (International), Lapilo, Goroka, EHP
Okiufa Primary School, Goroka, EHP
Oksapmin High School, West Sepik Province
Oksapmin Primary School, West Sepik Province
OLSH Secondary School, Vunapope, East New Britain Province
Onerungka High School, Kainantu, Eastern Highlands Province 
Pam Primary School, Balopa, Manus Province
Pangia Secondary School, Pangia, SHP
Papitalai Secondary School, Los Negros island, Manus Province
Par Primary School, Enga Province
Paradise High School, Boroko, NCD
Passam National High School, East Sepik Province
Pausa Secondary School, Enga Province
Pilapila Primary School, Rabaul, ENBP
Popondetta Primary School, Oro Province 
Popondetta Secondary School, Oro Province
Port Moresby National High School, National Capital District
Professor Schindler Primary School, Kainantu, EHP
Rabaul International Primary School, Takubar, East New Britain Province
Raicost High School
Reintabe Lutheran High School, Goroka, EHP
Resurrection Primary School, Popondetta, Oro Province
Rieit Primary School, Pomio District, East New Britain Province
Sakarip Primary School, Enga Province
Sacred Heart International Primary School (SHIPS), Rabaul, East New Britain Province
Sacred Heart Secondary, Hagita, Milne Bay Province
Sari Primary, Enga Province
St. Francis Primary School, Uiaku Tufi, Northern (Oro) Province
St. Johns Primary School, Bwagaoia, Misima Island, Milne Bay Province
St. Joseph Nanpapar Primary School, Kerevat, ENBP
St Joseph's School, Mabiri
St. Mary's Vuvu Secondary School, ENBP
St. Mary's Primary School, Wewak, East Sepik
St. Pauls Lutheran Secondary School,  Enga Province (formerly Pausa High School)
St. Pauls Primary School, Gerehu Stage 6, Port Moresby, NCD
Sangan Primary School, Markham District, Morobe Province 
Santa Maria High School, Watuluma, MBP
Sir Tei Abal Secondary School, Enga Province (formerly Wabag Secondary School) 
Sogeri National High School, Central Province
Tabaga Primary School, Nebilyer, WHP
Tabubil International Primary School
Tairora High School, Kainantu, EHP
Tambul High School, WHP
Taraka Primary School, Lae
Tavui Primary School, Rabaul, East New Britain Province
Tekin Primary School, West Sepik Province
Telefomin Secondary School, West Sepik Province
Togban Community School, Jimi District, WHP
Togoba Secondary School, Mt Hagen, WHP
Tomianap Primary School, Oksapmin, West Sepik Province
Trevor Freestone Primary School, Watabung EHP
Tsengoropa Primary School, Jimi District, WHP
Tsikiro Primary School, Enga Province
Tusbab Secondary School
Ufeto Christian Academy, Goroka, WHP 
Ukarumpa International School, Primary Campus and Secondary Campus
Utmei Secondary School, East New Britain Province
Utu Secondary School, New Ireland Province
Volavolo Primary School, Rabaul, East New Britain Province
Vunabosco Agro-Technical Secondary School, Kokopo, East New Britain Province
Wabag Primary School, Enga Province
Wawin National High School, Morobe Province
Warangoi Primary School, East New Britain Province
Warangoi Secondary School, East New Britain Province
Wesley Secondary School, Milne Bay Province
Wewak International Primary School, Wewak, East Sepik Province
Wingei Primary School, ESP
Yangoru AOG Primary School, ESP
YC FODE, Goroka, EHP

Vocational education

Basenenka Vocational School, Kainantu, EHP, Papua New Guinea
Caritas Technical Secondary School, Boroko, NCD 
Dirima Vocational School, Chimbu Province
Fatima Vocational School, Banz, WHP.
Gembogal Vocational School, Gembogal, Chimbu Province
Goroka Business College, EHP
Hohola Youth Development Center, Hohola, NCD
IT Job Training Center, Gordons, NCD
Kabaira Girls Vocational Center, Rabaul, ENBP
Kabaleo Vocational Centre, Kokopo, ENBP
Kamaliki Vocational School, Goroka, EHP
Kip Top-up School, SHP
Kuiaro Tech High School, Milne Bay Province
Kundiawa Vocational School, Chimbu Province
Lae Technical College, Lae, Morobe Province
Madang Technical College, Madang, Madang Province
Maina Vocational School Denglagu, Chimbu Province
Malahang Technical Vocational, Lae, Morobe Province
Mendi School of Nursing, SHP
Mendi Vocational Center, SHP
Mingende Vocational School, Chimbu Province
Moramora Technical School, WNBP
Mt Hagen Technical College, WHP
Munhiu To-pup School, SHP
Palie Vocational School, Lihir, NIP
Popondetta Vocational Training Centre, Oro Province 
Raval Vocational Training Center, Rabaul, ENB
Reibiamul Vocational School, Mt. Hagen, WHP
Tambul Vocational School, WHP
Topa Top-up School, SHP
Vunamami Farmers Training Center, Kokopo, ENBP
Ngi Multi Skills Heavy Equipment Training Centre, Kokopo, East New Britain

Universities and tertiary education
Universities:

 University of Papua New Guinea, Port Moresby, NCD
 University of Goroka, Goroka, Eastern Highlands
 University of Natural Resources and Environment, ENBP
 Papua New Guinea University of Technology (Unitech), Lae 

Other Tertiary Education:

 Balob Teachers College
 Catholic Theological Institute, Bomana
 Chanel College, Kokopo, East New Britain
 Christian Leaders Training College, Banz, Western Highlands
 Divine Word University, Madang 
 Don Bosco Technological Institute, Boroko, NCD
 Gaulim Teachers College, Rabaul, ENBP
 Goroka Baptist Bible College
 Institute of Business Studies, Port Moresby, NCD
 Kabaleo Teachers College, Kokopo, ENBP
 Kandep Provincial High School, Wabag 
 Kudjip College of Nursing, WHP (also known as Nazarene College of Nursing)
 Madang Teachers College
 Madang University Centre
 Melanesian Nazarene Bible College, Western Highlands
 Melanesia Nazarene Teachers College, Jiwaka
 Newton Theological College, Popondetta, Oro Province
 Pacific Adventist University, Boroko, NCD 
 Pacific Bible College, Pabrabuk, Nebilyer, Western Highlands 
 Port Moresby Business College, Port Moresby, NCD
 Sacred Heart Teachers' College, Bomana, NCD
 St Benedict Teachers College, Wewak, East Sepik 
 Sonoma Adventist College, Kokopo, East New Britain Province
 Tambul Bible College, Tambul, Western Highlands

See also

References

Schools
Papua New Guinea
Papua New Guinea

Schools
Schools
Papua New Guinea